Mackaya bella, called the forest bell bush, is a species of flowering plant in the acanthus family Acanthaceae, native to South Africa. 

The plant is not hardy below , so in temperate zones requires protection during the winter months. However, it may be placed outside in a sheltered spot in summer. It requires an alkaline or neutral soil. 

It has gained the Royal Horticultural Society's Award of Garden Merit.

References

Acanthaceae
Endemic flora of South Africa
Plants described in 1859